"Too Much is Not Enough" is a song written by David Bellamy and Ron Taylor, and recorded by American country music duo The Bellamy Brothers as a collaboration with The Forester Sisters.  It was released in September 1986 as the first single from The Bellamy Brothers' album Country Rap.  The song was the ninth number one on the country chart for The Bellamy Brothers.  The single went to number one for one week and spent a total of fifteen weeks within the top 40.

Charts

Weekly charts

Year-end charts

References
 

1986 singles
1986 songs
The Bellamy Brothers songs
The Forester Sisters songs
Song recordings produced by Emory Gordy Jr.
MCA Records singles
Curb Records singles
Songs written by David Bellamy (singer)
Vocal collaborations